Javier Camuñas Gallego (born 17 July 1980) is a Spanish retired professional footballer. A versatile midfielder (able to play as an attacking midfielder or in the wings), he could also appear as a second striker.

He amassed La Liga totals of 205 games and 24 goals over the course of eight seasons, representing in the competition Rayo Vallecano, Recreativo, Osasuna, Villarreal and Deportivo. He added 155 matches and 27 goals in Segunda División, mainly with Xerez.

Club career
After starting out at modest and local club CA Pinto, Madrid-born Camuñas switched to neighbours Rayo Vallecano, first representing its reserves. He was then loaned to another team from the capital, Getafe CF (by that time in the Segunda División B).

Camuñas returned to Rayo in the 2002–03 season, making his La Liga debut on 1 September 2002 in a 2–2 home draw against Deportivo Alavés. Rayo finished the campaign last and he went on to have four steady years in the Segunda División, with Ciudad de Murcia and Xerez CD, totalling 18 league goals in his final two.

Having been acquired by top-flight Recreativo de Huelva for 2007–08, Camuñas was one of the Andalusians' most important players as they barely avoided relegation. He played all the matches save one – 28 of those complete –  and netted on five occasions.

In the following season, Camuñas scored even more (ten), but Recre finished last. In late August 2009, he signed a three-year contract with top tier club CA Osasuna. an everpresent figure in his first year, he netted his first goal on 24 January 2010, against former side Xerez (2–1 away victory).

Camuñas was again first choice for Osasuna in 2010–11. On 30 January 2011 he scored the game's only goal in a home defeat of Real Madrid, which he had represented as a youth.

On 19 July 2011, Camuñas signed with Villarreal CF for three years. He struggled to gain playing time in his first season, also suffering physical problems. On 5 February 2012 he scored his first official goal for the Yellow Submarine, the last in a 2–1 win at Sevilla FC for the team's first away of the campaign, which eventually ended in relegation after 12 years.

Camuñas agreed to a one-year loan at Deportivo de La Coruña of the same league in August 2012. He met the same fate at the end of his only season, netting in the 2–1 away loss against Osasuna on 20 January 2013.

References

External links

1980 births
Living people
Spanish footballers
Footballers from Madrid
Association football midfielders
Association football wingers
Association football forwards
Association football utility players
La Liga players
Segunda División players
Segunda División B players
Tercera División players
Rayo Vallecano B players
Getafe CF footballers
Rayo Vallecano players
Ciudad de Murcia footballers
Xerez CD footballers
Recreativo de Huelva players
CA Osasuna players
Villarreal CF players
Deportivo de La Coruña players